David Day may refer to:

David Day (Canadian writer) (born 1947), author from British Columbia
David Day (historian) (born 1949), Australian historian
David Day (broadcaster) (1951–2015), Australian radio broadcaster, known as "Daisy"
Dave Day (musician) (1941–2008) of the punk band The Monks
David Day (Minnesota politician) (1825–1896), politician from Minnesota Territory
David A. Day (missionary) (1854–1897), Lutheran missionary
David A. Day (born 1963), American politician in the Missouri House of Representatives
David F. Day (1847–1914), Union Army soldier and Medal of Honor recipient
David V. Day (born 1936), British theologian and academic
David Van Day (born 1956), English singer and media personality

See also
Dave Days (born 1991), American musician